Indera Sports Club (abbrev: ISC), formerly Kilat FC and Indera Football Association, is a multi-sports club based in Brunei, mostly known for its association football team.

History

Early years 
Kilat FC was founded in 1970 by nobleman Pengiran Anak Hassanuddin Al-Haj bin Pengiran Anak Safiuddin with his siblings, and was based in Kilanas. The club underwent several name changes Indera Football Association and Indera Football Club. Over the years they became an established force in the local football scene, winning district-level championships in the seventies and eighties.

Success in Brunei 
In 2002, Indera became one of the teams that featured in the inaugural Proton B-League, but finished fifth in their group and failed to advance to the second stage. They accomplished this the next season, finishing in sixth place. They then made eighth place for the next three seasons, in risk of relegation to the Premier II, the second level of the Brunei league structure then. In the 2009–10 season, the team was boosted by the arrivals of Sairol Sahari, Azwan Saleh and Helmi Zambin on loan from DPMM FC, ultimately faring much better in sixth place.

In early 2010, the club management decided to change its name to Indera Sports Club to incorporate other disciplines such as futsal, badminton and netball. The football team entered the Brunei Super League as a founding member in 2012, winning the championship thanks to stellar performances by future Brunei stars such as Azwan Ali Rahman, Nurikhwan Othman and Abdul Mu'iz Sisa, with the astute signing of Hamizan Aziz Sulaiman from QAF FC the previous year also becoming a major contributing factor. They won both Super League championships in 2013 and 2014. They had their biggest win by demolishing Najib FC 20–1 in the 2013 Super League. During the 2014 Super League, Indera retained the championship, with a solitary defeat to MS ABDB their only blemish all season.

The 2015 Super League match between ISC and Tabuan Muda, which was called off last Sunday, has been requested to be replayed. After 61 minutes, the match at the Track & Field Sports Complex in Berakas was abandoned when Shahrin Momin, the captain of ISC, was sent off after receiving a second yellow card, leaving just eight players on the field. The game, which had no goals, was interrupted right away by the referee, who stated that one side's team could not have more than eight players. The choice, meanwhile, did not follow FIFA regulations. The team came in runners-up after the champions MS ABDB.

Despite losing to MS ABDB in the Super League of that year, Indera finally defeated them 2–0 at the Hassanal Bolkiah National Stadium and was awarded the 2015 DST Sumbangsih Cup. Both Sam Ford and Hamizan Aziz Sulaiman scored each of the winning goals for ISC after half-time.

Indera SC won their second Super Cup after winning the finals 2–1 against MS ABDB. Amirul Hakeem Kasim broke the equalizer by scoring on the 107th minute of the match. The club won the 2017–18 FA Cup after two winning goals each scored by Zulkhairy Razali and Asri Aspar against MS PDB. ISC would proceed to win the following 2018 Super Cup after a 2–1 victory against MS ABDB that same year.

2020 AFC Cup 
Indera SC debuts for the 2020 Asian Football Confederation (AFC) Cup. During the first leg play-offs, Indera was thrashed 6–1 by Yangon United at the Hassanal Bolkiah National Stadium. On 13 December 2019, the club officially announced the signing of four foreign players prior to their second leg knockout against Yangon United. The players were Rodrigo Tosi, Marcelo Carvalho de Souza, Prince Yamoah Boafo and Tekson Tubeng. ISC was again defeated 3–1, with Marcelo and Rodrigo Tosi scoring the two Indera goals of that tournament. The club was sent home after an aggregated 9–1 loss.

The club was at 7th place in the 2020 Super League when it was unexpectedly postponed and eventually cancelled due to the ongoing COVID-19 pandemic in the country, ending the tournament with only two matches completed. This would occur again prior to the 2021 Super League following to the restrictions reapplied by the Ministry of Health, and finally abandoned after orders made by the Football Association of Brunei Darussalam (FABD). That following year, the restrictions were lifted and the club would participate in the 2022 FA Cup, it also being the only football tournament held by the FABD for the year. ISC would only made it as far as the quarter finals after two devastating losses, 5–1 and 8–0 against DPMM FC.

Club crest

Its name having royal connotations, the colours in Indera's crest are those of the Bruneian royal family.

Current squad

Honours

 Brunei Super League 
 Champions (2): 2012–13, 2014
 Runners-up (2): 2015, 2016
 Brunei FA Cup
 Champions (1): 2017–18
 Runners-up (2): 2012, 2015
 Piala Sumbangsih 
 Champions (2): 2015, 2018
 Runners-up (3): 2014, 2016, 2017
 Brunei Pepsi Cup
 Runners-up (1): 2005

Continental record

Indera Sports Club Academy 
The Indera Sports Club Academy (ISCA) was founded as part of the club's Youth Development Programme on 28 April 2019. It is another significant step in the effective management of the ISC in inspiring a generation of players from the grassroots to the young level. According to the ISC head of Youth Development Roney Morni, the academy has attracted 100 players by 2020. The under (U)-19, U-16, U-12, U-10 and U-8 age groups are supervised and coached by 15 coaches, including four female trainers.

References

External links
 Indera SC official Instagram
 Indera Sports Club Academy – Registration Form
 Official Blog 

Football clubs in Brunei